Thomas Bryant may refer to:

 Slim Bryant (1908–2010), American country music singer-songwriter
 Thomas Bryant (basketball) (born 1997), American professional basketball player
 Thomas Bryant (cricketer) (1933–2012), South African cricketer
 Tommy Bryant (1930–1982), American jazz double-bassist

See also
 Tom Bryant (disambiguation)